Vakhrino is a rural locality (a village) in Polozovoskoye Rural Settlement, Bolshesosnovsky District, Perm Krai, Russia. The population was 21 as of 2010.

Geography 
Vakhrino is located 48 km south of Bolshaya Sosnova (the district's administrative centre) by road. Osinovka is the nearest rural locality.

References

rural localities in Bolshesosnovsky District